Albania participated at the 2018 Summer Youth Olympics in Buenos Aires, Argentina from 6 October to 18 October 2018.

Athletics

Boxing

Boys

Girl

Swimming

Weightlifting

References

2018 in Albanian sport
Nations at the 2018 Summer Youth Olympics
Albania at the Youth Olympics